2-Propylheptanol (2PH) is a chemical compound with various industrial uses.  It is a colorless waxy or oily solid.

Production
2-Propylheptanol is an oxo alcohol, meaning that it is produced from the hydroformylation ("oxo synthesis") of C4 alkenes followed by hydrogenation of the resulting aldehyde.  It can also be prepared by a production route that is similar to that for 2-ethylhexanol:

Applications
Such compounds enjoy many applications, including as raw materials for plasticizers, resins, processing solvents, and precursors to detergents. Heat stabilizers manufactured for PVC compounds use similar high boiling and high molecular weight oxo-alcohols, which enhance product performance. A further application area of this C10 alcohol is for the manufacture of oleate- and palmitate-based materials used by the cosmetics industry. Due to its very limited miscibility with water, 2PH can be used as a special solvent, with potential application in life sciences.  A promising application of these alcohols would be as precursors to acrylate monomers, potentially conferring enhanced flexibility.

References

Alkanols